"Choker" is a song written and recorded by American musical duo Twenty One Pilots. It is the second single from their sixth studio album, Scaled and Icy. The song was released on April 30, 2021, alongside a music video.

Background
Regarding the writing process of the track, Joseph described it as a "rash" for referring him to dig back into older songwriting habits and methods. He explained: "...It's another thing when [a song] comes up organically – almost like an old habit that is inevitably a part of who you are, and still makes up the fibres of who you are. It's mostly dormant, but every once in a while it flares up. That's what "Choker" is: a flare up of an old rash that we thought we cured. And we're proud of that rash! We like that rash. The rash is who we are. We had to itch it."

In the same interview, Tyler recalled: "I remember when I locked into the writing of [the song], it just flowed; it was scary how easy that song was for me to write, and it was because I knew I was coming from a place, and I was in a realm that I had spent a lot of time in before. And I was comfortable there; I was familiar with my surroundings. And that's why it was such an easy song to write." He also stated that, although the band is evolving and maturing, he doesn't need to not look back to his old writing styles previously established on pre-Blurryface albums, such as Twenty One Pilots, Regional at Best and Vessel. "I think "Choker" is the beginning of me being okay with the entire body of work, and feeling like I don't have to steer away from some things that people would consider from our older records."

Music video
The video, directed by Mark C. Eshleman, was filmed at Big Fun, a toy store located in Columbus, Ohio, the hometown of members Tyler Joseph and Josh Dun. Joseph plays an anxious customer who is interested in a small blue dragon named Trash, inside of a display case, and Dun plays the emotionless shopkeeper. Joseph steals the toy leading Dun to chase him down, eventually capturing him with a net gun before transforming him into a toy by emitting blue rays from his eyes and mouth. As of April 2022, the video has garnered over 19 million views.

Personnel
Credits adapted from the liner notes of Scaled and Icy.

Twenty One Pilots 
 Tyler Joseph  vocals, guitar, bass, piano, keyboards, organs, synthesizers, programming, production
 Josh Dun  drums, percussion

Additional musicians 
 Matt Pauling  violin, drum engineering

Charts

References

2021 singles
Twenty One Pilots songs
Fueled by Ramen singles
Indie pop songs
Songs written by Tyler Joseph